May Township is located in Lee County, Illinois. As of the 2010 census, its population was 304 and it contained 141 housing units. May Township was formed from Hamilton Township in September, 1854.

Geography

Demographics

References

External links
 US Census
 City-data.com
 Cook County Official Site
 Illinois State Archives

Townships in Lee County, Illinois
1854 establishments in Illinois
Populated places established in 1854
Townships in Illinois